Kilmarnock Athletic Football Club was an association football club from Ayrshire in Scotland.

History

The club was founded in 1877, as a merger between the Kilmarnock Cricket Club and the Winton club.  For its first season the club was known as the Kilmarnock Cricket and Football Club and its first competitive match was a defeat in the first round of the Ayrshire Cup in 1877–78.

The following season, the club joined the Scottish Football Association.  The renamed Athletics were quickly successful, winning the Ayrshire Cup in 1878–79.  From 1881 to 1884 the club was one of the top clubs in Scotland.  In 1881–82, the club reached the semi-final of the Scottish Cup, only narrowly losing to Queen's Park.

In 1882–83, the club had an annus mirabilis, winning two of the Ayrshire trophies; the Ayrshire Cup and the  Kilmarnock Merchants' Charity Cup, the latter of which was awarded to the club when Hurlford F.C. walked off the pitch in protest at going 2–1 behind in the final.  The Athletics also repeated the previous year's feat of reaching the Scottish Cup semi-final.  The club was drawn to play Vale of Leven away, and held the Alexandria side to a draw, only to lose 2–0 in the replay at home.

The club's Cup runs paradoxically caused the club's demise.  The club was now an attractive friendly fixture for English clubs, and the Athletics went on tour of England over the following winter.  The legalisation of professional football in England meant the players were susceptible to offers of professional contracts south of the border.  The club had started the 1884–85 season with its record win, 14–0 over Stewarton Cunninghame F.C. in the Scottish Cup, but the club's leading player, John Goodall, plus two other players (Hay and Walkinshaw), left the club during the winter; the Great Lever club persuaded them not to return home with the Athletic after a friendly in Bolton.  The club also lost three other players to Halliwell F.C..

A month after defeat to Ayr F.C. in the Merchants' Cup in 1884–85, the club was wound up.

Later clubs

The name Kilmarnock Athletic was used for two clubs in the years afterwards; a junior club formerly known as Kilmarnock Britannia, who used the name in the 1886–87 season, and a senior club originally known as Rosebank, who used the name from 1889 to 1900.

Colours

The club's colours were listed as crimson shirts (until 1880), scarlet shirts (until 1883), and maroon shirts (until dissolution), with white shorts.

Ground

The club's ground was Holm Quarry, which was briefly shared by Kilmarnock F.C. until the rent forced Killie to find an alternative pitch.

Notable players

John Goodall, Double winner with Preston North End

References

Kilmarnock Athletic
Sport in Kilmarnock
Association football clubs established in 1877
Association football clubs disestablished in 1885